Gnorimoschema ilyella is a moth in the family Gelechiidae. It was described by Zeller in 1877. It is found in Colombia.

References

Gnorimoschema
Moths described in 1877